Lysychansk is a city in the Sievierodonetsk Raion of the Luhansk Oblast in Eastern Ukraine occupied by Russia. Prior to 2020 municipal classification reforms, it was incorporated as a city of oblast significance. It is located on the high right bank of the Donets river, approximately 115 km from the oblast capital, Luhansk. It faces Sievierodonetsk across the river. Its population prior to the 2022 Russian invasion of Ukraine was approximately  

Prior to 2022, the administration of Lysychansk Municipality included the settlements of Novodruzhesk and Pryvillia. Together with the cities of Sievierodonetsk, Rubizhne, Kreminna and the nearest towns. The Lysychansk area constituted a major urban and industrial hub of the Donbas area, with a 2009 population of about 353,000.

In the 2022 Russian invasion of Ukraine, the city became the site of fierce fighting, and a major battle, the Battle of Lysychansk, which ended with the capture of the city by Russian forces and the Luhansk People's Republic on 2 July. After the September 2022 annexation referendums in Russian-occupied Ukraine, Russia claimed the city was now part of Russia.

During the Battle of Lysychansk, the city's population was reported to have fallen to 10-12,000. It is unknown how many residents are currently in the city.

History (1721–2013) 
In 1721, coal was discovered in the Donets basin near Lisya Balka, a Cossack village established in 1710.  In 1795, Lysychansk was the first coal-mining settlement of the Donets basin.

Earlier settlements in the area around Lysychansk were completely destroyed by the Muscovy punitive expedition against the Bulavin Rebellion. After suppressing the uprising, the area was resettled with Voronove (founded by Khokhlov's Cossacks), Syrotyne (Popov's and Sirotin's Cossacks), Borivske (partly settled by former residents of the burned the Borovskaya Sloboda), Metiolkine (Metelnikov's Cossacks) and Smolianynove (Smolkin's Cossacks).

A local newspaper has been published in the city since January 1918.

The current city limits of Lysychansk were finalized by the mid-1960s. In 1962, the city of Sievierodonetsk separated from Lysychansk and became its own independent city. In 1963, the towns of Novodruzhesk and Pryvillia were included in the city limits of Lysychansk and became cities. In 1965, Lysychansk incorporated the settlements of Verkhnie and Proletarsk.

Russo-Ukrainian war

2014

During the 2014 pro-Russian conflict in Ukraine the town was captured early April 2014 by pro-Russian separatists. It remained under control of separatists for three months, until 22 July 2014 Ukrainian Ukrinform reported that the separatists "massively left Lysychansk" with "seized cars from the population and in parking lots;" Russian ITAR-TASS reported the same day that the separatists had "decided to leave the town in order to save the population and stop clashes." This was mainly because their defeat in the Siege of Sloviansk and the evacuation of Kramatorsk made holding the city untenable. The next day heavy fighting continued around the town while the Ukrainian National Guard and the Ukrainian army released a statement that stated "the military plan to free Lysychansk, Luhansk region, from terrorist groups in the near future." On 24 July 2014 the Ukrainian army claimed its troops had entered Lysychansk and its Col. Andriy Lysenko stated "We will take the town, and the road will be open to Horlivka, then Donetsk." On 25 July 2014, Ukrainian forces secured the city from the pro-Russian separatists.

2022

During the 2022 Russian invasion of Ukraine, Lysychansk came under heavy shelling from the Russian military. Some of the most intense strikes occurred late in March 2022, which destroyed dozens of buildings and caused civilian casualties. On 9 May 2022, Russian troops attempted to cross over the Seversky Donets river with a temporary pontoon bridge near Bilohorivka. Ukrainian forces anticipated this approach, monitored the bridge construction, bombing the bridge and Russian vehicles who already crossed resulting in severe Russian losses. Russia made several such attempts, many of which were neutralized by Ukrainian forces.

After the Russian capture of Sievierodenetsk, Lysychansk became the last major city in the Luhansk region under Ukrainian control. On 26 June, TASS reported that Russian forces entered the city from five directions. On 27 June, the CNN reported that civilians in Lysychansk have been urged to leave immediately, as Russian forces gain ground in the city.

On 2 July 2022, reports of Ukrainian troops withdrawing from the city and Russian forces moving in were supported by multiple videos from Kadirov's 141st Special Motorized Regiment declaring victory in front of the City Council of Lysychansk.

"After heavy fighting for Lysychansk, the defence forces of Ukraine were forced to withdraw from their occupied positions and lines," the army general staff said.
Earlier Russia's Defence Minister Sergei Shoigu said his forces had captured Lysychansk and taken full control of Luhansk region.
Ukraine's troops were outgunned there.
Its general staff said that "in order to preserve the lives of Ukrainian defenders, a decision was made to withdraw". (BBC 4 July 2022)

On 19 September 2022, Ukrainian troops recaptured Bilohorivka, a village 10km from the city.

Geography

Lysychansk is located in the North-Western part of the Luhansk region, 115 km from Luhansk, on the high right bank of the Siverskyi Donets River. The area is surrounded by large hills, ravines and valleys. The city is situated on the northern spur of the Donets Ridge.

Lysychansk lies in the continental climate of the steppe zone of Ukraine. Water resources stemming from here are one of the most important resources. Siverskyi Donets River is the main water artery of the Lysychansk and the whole region. The length of the Siverskyi Donets River within the city is 26.5 km. Verkhnia Bilenka River, a tributary of the Siverskyi Donets River, flows through the southern part of the city, the length of the river within the city is 7.7 km.

Climate
Lysychansk  has a humid continental climate (Dfb) according to the Köppen climate classification system.

Summers are warm and sometimes humid with average high temperatures of 26–27 °C (78.8–80.6 °F) and lows of 14–15 °C (57.2–59 °F). Winters are relatively cold with average high temperatures of −1 °C (30.2 °F) and lows of −8 to −6 °C (17.6 to 21.2 °F). Spring and autumn are generally chilly to mild.

The highest ever temperature recorded in the city was 41.0 °C (105.8 °F) in June 1984. The coldest temperature ever recorded in the city was −34.0 °C (−29.2 °F) in February 1954.

Annual precipitation is 480 millimeters (18.9 in) with moderate rainfall throughout the year. Light snowfall mainly occurs from December through March, but snow cover does not usually remain for long.

Population
  the population of Lyscychansk was 103,459.
 According to the 2001 Census the population of the city proper was 115,229 people, while the population of the total area governed by the city council was 133,258 people.

As of 2006, the ethnic populations were:
 Ukrainians — 66.7%
 Russians — 30.5%
 Belarusians — 1%
 Others — 1.8%

Industry
Before 2010, Lysychansk was among the biggest industrial centres in Luhansk Oblast. Since 2010, many plants have closed, with massive lay-offs.

The city and the surrounding area has five coal mines owned by Lysychanskvuhillia. Coal reserves amount to 179.7 million tons. Production capacity is 2.8 million tons of coal per year.

Media 
 Newspaper "Новый путь" (New Path)
 Television and Radio Company "Акцент" (Accent)
 Publishing house "Час Пик" (Rush Hour)

Education 
Institutes of higher education in Lysychansk include the Donbas State Technical University and Luhansk State University of Internal Affairs.

Attractions 
 Fox Beam – "the cradle of Donbas."
 Pereiznianska Church.
 National History Museum and the Polovtsian stone images (center, Lenin).
 Monument to the first mine in the Donbas Region.
 Monument Rudoznavtsiu Gregory Kapustin (the central market).
 Monument to Marshal of the Soviet Union Kliment Voroshilov (Pereizna District).
 House-Museum of Marshal of the Soviet Union Kliment Voroshilov  (St. Pereizna, the former switch tower) – destroyed.
 T-34 Tank – a monument to the defenders and liberators of Lysychansk.
 Monument Lysychanam – pilots of the WWII (District RTI, on a former airfield).
 WWII Memorial
 Chernobyl Monument
 Monument to the Ukrainian poet Volodymyr Sosiura (Glass District, Square at DC).
 Sosiura Palace of Culture.
 Claw lake and Recreation area 
 City Park "Water Station" 
 Gresovsky Recreation Park: in the woods on the left bank of the Siverskyi Donets River opposite of the Mount of Kirov. The park is now under repair. Between 1940 and 1960 the recreation park of the city, "Lyssoda" and Power Plant was full of attractions and a large stadium for sporting events.

Transportation

Bus
Trolleys and buses run to and from Lysychansk as well as within the city.  Most of the buses running in and out of the city start running after 6 am. until 7–9 pm. for different routes.

Direct regular bus service is available to other Ukrainian cities, including Donetsk, Kharkiv, Berdiansk, and Mariupol.

Railway
Lysychansk has a central railway station and three other railway stations: Nasvitevych, Pereizna, Volcheiarska. Almost all transit distance trains stop at Stations Pereizna and Volcheiarska, allowing residents of Southern Lysychansk not to be dependent on the central railway station (not actual from 2014). As of 2021, the non-central stations are only used for short-destination interurban trains (diesel commuter trains).

Lysychansk Central Railway Station has the following train routes:

138 – Khmelnytsky – Lysychansk
20 – Kyiv – Popasna
46 – Lysychansk – Uzhhorod

Since the Russo-Ukrainian War, there is no railway route available from Luhanska Oblast to Russian Federation. In most cases, Lysychansk Central Railway Station became the final destination for long-destination trains.

Airport
The nearest airport is located 12 kilometers from the city center, located in Sievierodonetsk.  Built in 1968 the airport is to serve residents and workers of the surrounding cities.  The airport is administered by the Lysychansk District pipeline OAO Ukrtransnafta.

Politics

In the 2004 Ukrainian presidential election, Viktor Yanukovych won 92.51% of the vote in Lysychansk. Runner-up Viktor Yushchenko received 5.08% of the vote.

In the 2010 Ukrainian presidential election, Viktor Yanukovych won 90.95% of the vote in Lysychansk. Runner-up Yulia Tymoshenko received 5.91% of the vote.

Notable people

 Fedir Abramov (1904–1982), Ukrainian geologist and mining specialist
 Nikolai Chuzhikov (born 1938), Olympic canoeist
  (born 1966) Ukrainian theater and film actor
 Sergey Piskunov (born 1989), Ukrainian hyperrealism painter
 Igor Sergeyev (1938–2006), Minister of Defense of Russia and Marshal of the Russian Federation
 Volodymyr Sosiura (1898–1965), Ukrainian lyric poet and writer
 Kliment Voroshilov (1881–1969), Marshal of the Soviet Union and Chairman of the Presidium of the Supreme Soviet

Gallery

References

External links

 
Cities in Luhansk Oblast
Bakhmutsky Uyezd
Donets
Sievierodonetsk Raion
Populated places established in 1710